The Manchaug Village Historic District is a historic district encompassing the 19th century industrial village center of Manchaug in Sutton, Massachusetts.  Developed in the 1820s around textile mills on the Mumford River, it was the largest industrial area in Sutton, with at least three mill complexes in operation. The district is centered on the junction of Main Street with Manchaug, Putnam Hill, and Whitins Roads.

Description and history
Manchaug was a praying town for converted Native Americans established by the Massachusetts Bay Colony in the 1650s.

The area that became Manchaug Village was a rural agricultural area until the early 19th century.  The only industry of note on the Mumford River was a trip hammer known to be in operation in 1795.  In 1826, investors from Rhode Island began purchasing water privileges and land along the river for the development of textile mills.  The stone mill standing at 9 Main Street was built in that, and was soon followed by housing for mill workers.  The mills where significantly expanded in the 1850s and 1860s, when the dam impounding Stevens Pond was built, followed by new mills and a major tract of mill housing.  The mills flourished until after World War I, and closed in 1921; the company-owned housing was sold off after bankruptcy in 1927.

The historic district is centered on the junction of Main Street with Manchaug, Putnam Hill, and Whitins Roads.  To the north, west, and south of this junction stand collections of mills, mill sites, and worker housing.  The surviving mill buildings are typically large stone structures, while the housing units a multifamily wood-frame dwellings with gabled roofs.  The mill operators also built some single-family housing, for supervisory and specialized technical personnel.  The Greek Revival Manchaug Baptist Church is one of the buildings not related directly to the mills; it was built in 1842 to serve the workers.

See also
National Register of Historic Places listings in Worcester County, Massachusetts

References

Historic districts in Worcester County, Massachusetts
Sutton, Massachusetts
National Register of Historic Places in Worcester County, Massachusetts
Historic districts on the National Register of Historic Places in Massachusetts